A fiscal-military state is a state that bases its economic model on the sustainment of its armed forces, usually in times of prolonged or severe conflict. Characteristically, fiscal-military states will subject citizens to high taxation for this purpose.

In the past, states such as Spain, the Netherlands and Sweden, which were embroiled in long-lasting periods of war for local or global hegemony, were organized as fiscal-military states. The British East India Company also employed military fiscalism in maintenance of rule in India during the mid-18th century. Colonial powers generated their revenue for the maintenance of the army. Currently, few states could be described as fiscal-military states, probably because of the decline of large-scale international conflicts in recent times.

See also
 War economy
 War effort

Further reading
The Rise of Fiscal States: A Global History, 1500-1914, eds. Bartolomé Yun-Casalilla, Patrick K. O'Brien and Francisco Comín Comín. ( Cambridge University Press, 2012).
The Rise of the Fiscal State in Europe c.1200-1815. Patrick Bonney, Oxford University Press, 1999.
The Fiscal-Military State in Eighteenth-Century Europe: Essays in honour of P.G.M. Dickson. Christopher Storrs, Routledge, 2016.

Notes

References
 Glete, Jan (2002) Spain, the Dutch Republic and Sweden as Fiscal-Military States, 1500-1660, London: Routledge 

Economic systems
Fiscal policy
Militarism
Military sociology
Military economics